Dil Chahta Hai is a 2001 Indian Hindi-language coming-of-age comedy drama film written and directed by Farhan Akhtar. It was produced by Ritesh Sidhwani and released under the banner of Excel Entertainment (which Akhtar and Sidhwani co-founded), marking their cinematic debut. The film focuses on a significant transition period in the romantic lives of 3 college-graduate friends (Aamir Khan, Saif Ali Khan and Akshaye Khanna). It also stars Preity Zinta, Sonali Kulkarni and Dimple Kapadia.

Dil Chahta Hai was based on Akhtar's diary detailing his trips to Mumbai and New York City, and a story by a friend of his, Kassim Jagmagia, who would ultimately become a creative associate at Excel Entertainment. He started writing the screenplay in 1998 but finished it when the film's principal photography was started two years later. It was one of the first films shot in sync sound, with Nakul Kamte and H. Sridhar handling its sound recording. The trio Shankar–Ehsaan–Loy, with lyrics penned by Akhtar's father, Javed Akhtar, composed the soundtrack and the background score.

Dil Chahta Hai premiered on 10 August 2001. The film performed moderately at the box office, grossing  after its theatrical run ended. It proved to be a major commercial success in metropolitan areas, but failed in rural areas; its failure in rural areas was attributed to the upper-class, city-oriented lifestyle it presented. It received widespread critical acclaim upon release, with praise for its fresh storyline, direction, soundtrack, cinematography, costumes and the performances of the cast. Several critics noted that it broke new ground by introducing a realistic portrayal of the modern Indian youth. 

A recipient of several accolades, Dil Chahta Hai won 2 awards at the 49th National Film Awards, including Best Feature Film in Hindi. At the 47th Filmfare Awards, the film received 13 nominations, including Best Film, Best Director (Farhan), Best Actor (Aamir) and Best Music Director (Shankar–Ehsaan–Loy), and won 7 awards, including Best Film (Critics) and Best Supporting Actor (Khanna) and Best Comedian (Saif).

Plot 
Akash, Sameer and Sid are best friends in college. They spend all their time together, taking trips, playing pranks on each other and supporting the other when needed. Upon graduating from college, they are forced to decide what to do with their lives ahead. Sameer's parents want to arrange his marriage with their friends' daughter, while Akash's parents ask him to manage the family business abroad. Sid is busy trying to become a painter and works to develop his skill. 

One day, Sid runs into his new neighbour, Tara. She takes an interest in his art and the two become friends. Despite her older age, Sid finds himself attracted to her. After a night out, Sid confesses to Sameer and Akash that he loves Tara. In typical fashion, the friends refuse to take him seriously. Sameer realizes that Sid is not joking but Akash continues to mock him, leading Sid to slap him. Infuriated, Akash leaves the scene, refusing to reconcile with Sid despite Sameer's attempts to mediate. Soon, Akash leaves for Sydney to work on the family business. 

Sid temporarily moves away to attend a painting workshop, leaving Sameer to his own means. He decides to pursue Pooja, the girl his parents wanted him to marry, and to whom he was attracted at first-sight. Pooja has a boyfriend but it seems their relationship is not going strong. When they inevitably break up, Sameer asks her out and Pooja agrees. 

In Sydney, Akash meets Shalini who shows him around the new city. The two soon fall in love, but she has to return to India to marry her fiancé, Rohit. Rohit is hot-tempered and had once punched Akash over a prank at their college's graduation party. Now, however, Akash is determined not to lose Shalini and shows up at her wedding. He proposes to her in front of all the guests, Rohit and his family. Rohit is enraged but decides to yield on being told by Shalini that she loves Akash too. 

Some time later, Sid returns home and calls Sameer up from a hospital. Sameer visits Sid, and at the waiting lounge of the hospital, catches Sid up on their life's events. They discuss the night Sid and Akash fell apart, and Sameer lies to Sid about being unable to contact Akash. The next morning, however, Akash arrives at the hospital to bury the hatchet with Sid. He apologizes to him, and the two hug. 

Meanwhile, Tara is about to die from liver cirrhosis. The hospital staff approach Sid to inform him, and he speaks with Tara for the last time in her hospital room. She thanks him for being there for her in her final moments and passes away, leaving Sid's love for her unrequited. Six months later, the friends visit Goa for a trip, accompanied by Shalini and Pooja. Sid sees a woman who resembles Tara, and approaches to talk to her. It is implied that she and Sid get together, as the three friends are shown enjoying dinner with their respective partners.

Cast 
Credits adapted from Bollywood Hungama:

 Aamir Khan as Akash Malhotra
 Saif Ali Khan as Sameer Mulchandani
 Akshaye Khanna as Siddharth "Sid" Sinha
 Preity Zinta as Shalini
 Sonali Kulkarni as Pooja
 Dimple Kapadia as Tara Jaiswal
 Ayub Khan as Rohit
 Rajat Kapoor as Mahesh, Shalini's maternal uncle
 Suchitra Pillai as Priya
 Suhasini Mulay as Sid's mother
 Yusuf Hussein as Naresh, Pooja's father
 Ahmed Khan (actor) as A. K. Malhotra, Akash's father

Production

Development 
Dil Chahta Hai was based on Farhan Akhtar's diary he wrote during his trips to Goa and his month-and-a-half-long stay in New York City in 1996, and a story by a friend of his, Kassim Jagmagia. He originally conceived a story about the romance between Akash and Shalini. He later shared it with his parents (Javed Akhtar and Honey Irani), who immediately liked his idea but suggested several changes. However, he felt the story was not exciting and unusual enough for him and started to develop other characters, including Akash's friends, making his initial idea become the film's subplot. He was quoted as saying that:

While co-directing music videos for Shankar Mahadevan's album Breathless (1998) with his sister Zoya Akhtar, Farhan began writing the film's screenplay under the working title of Hum Teen in 1998. After principal photography commenced in 2000, the film was retitled Dil Chahta Hai. Talking to the magazine Screen, he told them that the screenplay reflected himself, his friendships, and his concerns, adding that it was "definitely a fresh view of friendship in Hindi films". Farhan originally wrote the dialogue in English, and he translated it to Hindi in two months. This marked the cinematic debut of Akhtar and his friend Ritesh Sidhwani, who produced it under their banner of Excel Entertainment. Several elements of the film were inspired by the English playwright William Shakespeare's Much Ado About Nothing.

Casting 

Aamir Khan, Saif Ali Khan (no relation), Akshaye Khanna, Preity Zinta, Sonali Kulkarni, and Dimple Kapadia were chosen as the lead actors. 

Aamir, playing Akash Malhotra, described his character as a typical man of present-day India. He accepted to star in the film after reading the film's screenplay, which he noted for its freshness. He said, "He is, to a great extent, self-centered, doesn't believe in love and doesn't indulge in emotions. In that sense, he is quite shallow, but not really a bad guy at heart." He was also offered to portray Siddharth "Sid", but he did not want to change his mind because he believed he had played several roles of the same type. He admitted he liked the role of Akash, calling it was "something [he] never done before". In preparation, Aamir, 35, changed his style to a 24-year-old man in two months.

Saif was cast as Sameer Mulchandani, a part he found to resemble his personality. Particularly drawn to the qualities of his role, he described the film as a "learning experience". Initially, he did not want to star in the film, but Kapadia and Javed Akhtar persuaded him to do so, which meant that he replaced Abhishek Bachchan. 

Farhan initially wanted Hrithik Roshan to play the role of Siddharth "Sid" Sinha after seeing his performance in Kaho Naa... Pyaar Hai (2000). When Roshan declined due to date issues, Khanna stepped in to replace him. The press labelled this project as Khanna's comeback film post a self-imposed two-year hiatus, after having featured in several commercially unsuccessful films. Khanna mentioned Dil Chahta Hai has a unique concept, and his interest in its script made him sign on to the film. His role gave him "a very new sound, a very new look and a very young feel" as well as a new screen image. Aamir spoke positively of his rapport with them, confessing that it was his dream to collaborate with the two.

Zinta agreed to star in the film after reading its screenplay, which she referred to as "fabulous". Prior to filming, Zinta and Farhan had been long-time friends and had made a pact to do a film together. She performed a screen test at his house and was cast for the role of Shalini, Aamir's love interest, and spent three-and-a-half months in preparation for the role. 

While Kulkarni got the part as Sameer's love interest, and later fiancée Pooja, Kapadia was chosen for the middle-aged alcoholic interior designer and divorcée Tara and, according to Rediff.com, it was the first time she played the love interest of a much younger man. Kapadia told Filmfare that making the film was an enriching experience and called her part "a role to die for". In the interview, she also mentioned that the role was "very dark" as the character dies at the end of the film, which she did not like, and she felt that it has no "sunshine except this little bond that she forms with" Khanna's character, Sid. Considering her as the film's "surprise package", Farhan did not want to feature her in any of the promotional trailers and music videos aired on televisions because he wanted it to be a surprise the audience. Farhan's sister, Zoya, was in charge of the casting of the film.

Filming 
Filming started in 2000 and was completed in 108 days by Ravi K. Chandran, taking place in Mumbai, Goa, and Sydney. While Arjun Bhasin did the costume design, Farah Khan and Yunus Pathan were the choreographer and art director, respectively; Suzanne Caplan Merwanji worked as the production designer. Finished by Nakul Kamte and H. Sridhar, the film was shot in sync sound—which means that the sound was recorded at the time of the shooting—making it one of the first Indian films to use the technique. A. Sreekar Prasad edited the film. In an interview with Filmfare magazine, he stated that he was initially skeptical of Farhan Akhtar, a newcomer director. However, he later changed his mind after finding him to be more professional than other directors he worked with. Prasad said that he felt excited editing the Dil Chahta Hai, stating that it reminded him of his college days and calling Dil Chahta Hai a "revelation" for him.

Music 

The soundtrack and background score of Dil Chahta Hai were composed by Shankar–Ehsaan–Loy, after A. R. Rahman declined the offer due to date issues. The lyrics were penned by Javed Akhtar. The vocals were performed by Udit Narayan, Alka Yagnik, Caralisa Monteiro, Srinivas, Shaan, Kavita Krishnamurthy, Mahadevan, Clinton Cerejo, KK, Harvey, and Sonu Nigam. Noorani stated that the trio went to Khandala along with Farhan Akhtar, Javed Akhtar, and Sidhwani to compose six songs from a total of nine for the film in three-and-a-half days. Mendonsa described the experience as 35% of work and 65% fun and added that they had a "fantastic time". After staying in Khandala, Shankar–Ehsaan–Loy subsequently booked a studio to finish the recording in three weeks.

Release 
Dil Chahta Hai was one of the most anticipated Indian films of the year, owing to its plot of youth rarely touched in Indian cinema. The one-minute-long trailer was released on television and film theatres (along with Aamir's Lagaan) across India to increase audience enthusiasm and publicity from the media. Prior to its theatrical release, a special screening for Indian Home Minister L. K. Advani was held at his house in Delhi. The film premiered at theatres on 10 August 2001 and clashed with Deepak Shivdasani's romantic drama Yeh Raaste Hain Pyaar Ke, also starring Zinta in the lead. Dil Chahta Hai was later screened in several film festivals: the 33rd International Film Festival of India, the 14th Palm Springs International Film Festival, and the 11th Austin Film Festival.

Dil Chahta Hai was moderately successful at the box office, performing well in metropolitan areas, but failing in rural regions. Trade analysts attributed its commercial performance in rural regions to the city-oriented lifestyle depicted in the film. However, the film ran for more than 50 weeks, thereby becoming a golden jubilee film. It was released on 210 screens in India and grossed  on its opening day. It collected  by the end of its first weekend, and  after its first week. The film earned  from the country, becoming the fifth-highest-grossing Indian film that year. Overseas, Dil Chahta Hai was a commercial success, collecting $210,000 in North America and $100,000 in Atlantic countries in its opening first weekend. The film collected , and grossed  after finishing its overseas theatrical run, making itself the seventh-highest-grossing Indian film of the year. Box Office India estimated it grossed  internationally.

The television premiere of Dil Chahta Hai took place on 17 August 2002 on StarPlus. The film was released on DVD as a single-disc pack in the NTSC widescreen format on 14 December 2007, and the double-disc version was released simultaneously; Spark Entertainment distributed the latter. The film has been accessible for streaming on Amazon Prime Video and Netflix since 18 November 2016.

Critical reception 
Dil Chahta Hai received widespread critical acclaim upon release, with praise for its fresh storyline, soundtrack, Farhan's direction, cinematography, costumes and the performances of the cast. Several critics also noted that the film had a realistic portrayal of the modern Indian youth.

In a 4-star review published by Bollywood Hungama, the critic and trade analyst Taran Adarsh declared the film a landmark for Aamir's career. Adarsh considered the film to include the best performance of both Saif and Khanna's careers. Film critic Sita Menon felt Farhan had made "an impressive debut" with the film, praising him for developing the characters "very well". Menon also considered Khanna's performance "rich" and deep.

Writing for Screen, Piroj Wadia called the film "an amazing debut" for Farhan, further commending his "good" script and "fine" direction, along with "excellent" cinematography from Chandran. Dinesh Raheja found the film to have a "refreshingly wicked sense of humour". He agreed with Adarsh's opinion about Saif's performance, stating that he "brings the house down with his funny one-liners and seems to be having a whale of a time". Both Wadia and Raheja also complimented Kapadia in her brief role, stating that she had shown her range and versatility. Ziya Us Salam called Dil Chahta Hai "a rare film on male camaraderie, and bachelor bonding". He applauded its depiction of urban youth's lifestyle from middle and upper-middle-class families, adding that the film "is a rare situational comedy which does not have to rely on facial contortions and banana peels to raise peals of laughter. Here the situations are almost normal with reactions of the three leading characters almost as natural."

In a review carried by Filmfare, Arati Koppar hailed Dil Chahta Hai as a "fabulous ... attempt" for a directorial debut, claiming that Aamir was the best among the lead actors. Komal Nahta praised Zinta for "[looking] glamorous and sexy and acts beautifully. The new look of all the four aforementioned actors only adds to the freshness." He also saw Kapadia suited her role despite her aged look, but panned Kulkarni's "wasted" role. Apart from reviewing the performances, Nahta also expressed admiration for Farhan's direction and took note of his ability to handle the narration "with aplomb and belies the fact that this is his maiden attempt". Jasdeep Singh Pannu from NDTV labelled Dil Chahta Hai as a "wonderfully-crafted film" with "a melodramatic act, an element better kept to the conventional Bollywood movie". While Zee Next asserted it as one of the greatest Bollywood films of the year, Saibal Chatterjee elaborated: "Farhan demonstrates a style that is as sophisticated as it is impressive. Virtually every character in the intricate tapestry that the young filmmaker creates is utterly tangible, the emotions are completely believable, and the situations fraught with subtle drama."

The Malaysian newspaper New Straits Times K. N. Vijiyan inscribed, "This is very much a buddy-buddy film exploring the love affairs of three good friends who part ways and later, get back together." Vijiyan commented that the film was slightly different from the usual Bollywood masala films and felt that it would not appeal to the Indian audience; he also discussed its production aspects, opining that Chandran had spun "magic" with his cinematography. In her retrospective review for The Wall Street Journal, Beth Watkins wrote, "The mix of humour, emotion, sincerity and wisdom makes Dil Chahta Hai a truly enduring film."

See also 
 List of accolades received by Dil Chahta Hai

Notes

References

External links 
 
 

2000s buddy comedy films
2000s Hindi-language films
2000s road comedy-drama films
2001 comedy films
2001 directorial debut films
2001 drama films
2001 films
2001 romantic comedy-drama films
Best Hindi Feature Film National Film Award winners
Films based on Much Ado About Nothing
Films directed by Farhan Akhtar
Films scored by Shankar–Ehsaan–Loy
Films set in Australia
Films set in Mumbai
Films shot in Goa
Films shot in Mumbai
Films shot in Sydney
Indian buddy comedy films
Indian coming-of-age comedy-drama films
Indian road comedy-drama films
Indian romantic comedy-drama films
Sexuality and age in fiction